Leopold Potesil (13 May 1933 – 18 January 2023) was an Austrian boxer. He competed at the 1952 Summer Olympics and the 1956 Summer Olympics.

Potesil died on 18 January 2023, at the age of 89.

References

1933 births
2023 deaths
Austrian male boxers
Olympic boxers of Austria
Boxers at the 1952 Summer Olympics
Boxers at the 1956 Summer Olympics
Place of birth missing
Light-welterweight boxers
20th-century Austrian people